The Copa dos Campeões da Copa Brasil (Copa Brasil Champions Cup) was an official football competition organized in 1978 by the Brazilian Sports Confederation (CBD), predecessor of the Brazilian Football Confederation, and contested by past winners of the Campeonato Brasileiro Série A. 

The tournament was contested by past Brasileirão champions of the 1971, 1974 and 1977 editions: respectively Atlético Mineiro, Vasco da Gama and São Paulo. Palmeiras, champion in 1972 and 1973, and Guarani, champion in 1978, withdrew from the competition due to conflicting dates with the 1978 Campeonato Paulista. Internacional, champion of the 1975 and 1976 editions, was excluded by CBD because of legal disputes.

Atlético Mineiro won the competition, defeating São Paulo in the final in a penalty shootout.

Matches

Semifinal 
First leg
Second leg

Final

References

1978 in Brazilian football